She is sometimes confused with American actress Fran Ryan.

Madge Winifred Ryan (8 January 1919 – 9 January 1994) was an Australian actress, known for her stage and film roles in the United Kingdom, including London stage productions of Entertaining Mr Sloane (1964), Philadelphia, Here I Come (1967), and Medea (1993). She also starred in the Broadway production of Summer of the Seventeenth Doll (1958).  
 
Her film appearances included Summer Holiday (1963), A Clockwork Orange (1971), Frenzy (1972), and Who Is Killing the Great Chefs of Europe? (1978).

Between 1969 and 1975, Eric Idle,  (married to Lyn Ashley),  was Ryan's son-in-law.

Early life
Ryan was born in Townsville, Australia. Her daughter Lyn Ashley is also an actress.

Career

Ryan established herself as a theatre actor and member of the Independent Co. in Sydney, Australia, playing the role of Birdie Hubbard in The Little Foxes at the Independent and the Princess Theatres in 1948, while living in Epping, then a rural setting on Sydney’s outer fringe.

She toured with John Nugent-Hayward in The Patsy, Fresh Fields and Claudia. She was also known during the forties and fifties for her radio work.

Ryan emigrated to the United Kingdom in 1957 and starred in many British stage shows. She made over sixty appearances in films and on television.

In 1958, Ryan appeared in a Broadway-theatre production of Summer of the Seventeenth Doll. In 1964, she played Kath in the original London production of Joe Orton's Entertaining Mr Sloane. The Independent wrote, "as the dreadful Kath, ageing seductress and murderous landlady...Madge Ryan's cruel, cool but undeniably comic acting provoked one critic to describe her work...as 'something very close to perfection'."

Death
Ryan died in London in 1994, the day after her 75th birthday. In their obituary, The Independent wrote, "what set her apart from the others was a certain, often powerful, independence of spirit and humour...It was a fulfilled career."

Selected filmography
 Upstairs and Downstairs (1959) - Policewoman
 Witness in the Dark (1959) - Mrs. Finch
 Hand in Hand (1960) - George's Wife
 Tiara Tahiti (1962) - Millie Brooks
 Summer Holiday (1963) - Stella Winters
 Doctor in Distress (1963) - Mrs. Clapper
 This Is My Street (1964) - Kitty
 The Strange Affair (1968) - Aunt Mary
 I Start Counting (1969) - Mother
 A Clockwork Orange (1971) - Dr. Branom
 Public Eye (Come In To The Garden, Rose) (1971) - Rose Mason
 Frenzy (1972) - Mrs. Davison
 Endless Night (1972) - Michael's Mother
 All Creatures Great and Small (1978) - Miss Harbottle
 Who Is Killing the Great Chefs of Europe? (1978) - Beecham
 The Lady Vanishes (1979) - Rose Flood Porter
 S.O.S. Titanic (1979) - Stewards: Violet Jessop
 Kokoda Crescent (1989) - Margaret
 Splitting Heirs (1993) - Woman with Dog
 The Inspector Alleyn Mysteries, Death in a White Tie (1993) - Lucy Lorrimer

References

External links

1919 births
1994 deaths
Australian film actresses
Australian emigrants to England
Australian stage actresses
Australian television actresses
Actresses from Queensland
People from Townsville